, usually referred to by its initials IWGP, is a series of urban mystery novels by Ira Ishida. It was adapted into a drama television series directed by Tsutsumi Yukihiko. The television drama then got a manga adaptation. An anime television series adaptation of the original novel by Doga Kobo aired from October to December 2020.

Plot
The series revolves around 20-year-old Makoto, who frequently gets involved in highly dangerous situations, usually against his own judgment.

Characters

A 20 year old punk, Makoto loves to cut loose and pick up chicks. He is very charismatic, and is frequently approached by people who need help in desperate situations. Makoto has a vengeful side, which is seen after his girlfriend, Rika, was brutally murdered by an unknown assailant. Makoto also has school ties with the leader of the local gang, G Boys, and can call on him for help if he truly needs it. Raised in a single parent household, Makoto's mother runs a local fruit shop, and frequently uses and abuses him to watch the store.
TV Version: In the TV version Makoto is very similar to his manga counterpart. He is more fleshed out in the TV version. He frequently cons people into losing bets at one of the local bowling alleys, and also becomes an unofficial member of the G Boys. Makoto also falls for a girl that his mother hires for part-time help, a character that only appears in the TV series.

Rika is Makoto's girlfriend and is a typical teenage ganguro. They first met at the fountain at IWGP, although there are some slight differences between the manga and the TV versions. Rika would sell herself for money, and was found strangled in a motel after a botched meeting.
TV Version: In the TV version Rika is more demanding, and is described by Hikaru as a person who will use other people in order to get what they want.

Rika's best friend, Hikaru, is the more innocent seeming of the two, although she hides a horribly tragic past and a terrifying secret. In the TV series, she is much more forward in her attraction towards Makoto, whereas she is less so in the manga. Hikaru's real name is Hikariko (光子), although she has a deep loathing of the name.
TV Version: In the TV version Hikaru is less innocent than her manga counterpart, and is also incredibly jealous of any female attention Makoto receives, even when it is obvious that it is not romantically inclined. Hikaru's actions are also more erratic in the series, and at times her actions will push Makoto farther away than she'd like. When Yamai starts following her, Takashi posts guards around her.

 (G Boys King)

An old school-mate of Makoto's, Takashi is the leader of the G Boys, a local gang. He frequently comes off as goofy or playful, but that hides his true personality as a ruthless leader who will do anything to meet his own needs. He frequently comes to Makoto's aid whenever it is needed, but will not hesitate to ask for favors in return.
TV Version: In the TV version Takashi has an older girlfriend named Jessie, who is almost always at his side. Takashi is more ruthless in the TV series, and has more of a role than in the manga. Surprisingly, he is very anti-drug and refuses to allow any of his gang members to purchase or use drugs, (although he did allow one member to purchase drugs in order to flush out a drug pusher.)

A young artist, Shun first meets Makoto and Masa while he is shoplifting in a local bookstore. Shy and quiet, Shun craves the approval of Makoto and his friends, and breaks laws just to fit in.
TV Version: In the TV version Shun is quieter and has less of a role. Since Hikaru is present at the time of the Chiaki incident, she is the one who purchases the drugs instead of Shun. Also, Makoto and Masa first meet Shun as he is shoplifting at a bookstore, and he actually steals a local landmark later in order to impress them.

Makoto's best friend and a would-be ladies man. He often tries (with not much success) to hit on girls, but most often spends his time with Makoto.
TV Version: In the TV version Masa has a part-time job at one of the local bowling alleys, where he and Makoto often scam people out of their money.

Yamai was formerly an old schoolmate of Makoto and Takashi, and had even challenged Takashi to a fight. He is best known for killing a blood thirsty doberman at the request of a group of schoolmates. Yamai kidnaps Hikaru, with his only explanation being that she "is just like him".
TV Version: In the TV version Yamai temporarily joins the G Boys, and tries to sell drugs in order to incriminate Takashi. When Takashi discovers this, he cuts off Yamai's finger and throws him out of the G Boys.

Media

Novel

Drama series

Manga

Anime
On September 2, 2019, it was announced that the novel series would receive an anime television series adaptation by Doga Kobo. The series was directed by Tomoaki Koshida, with Fumihiko Shimo handling series composition, Junichirō Taniguchi designing the characters and Daijirō Nakagawa and Ryūichi Takada composing the music. The series was originally set to premiere in July 2020. However, it was delayed to October 6 due to the COVID-19 pandemic. The Pinballs performed the opening theme "Needle Knot," while Innosent in Formal performed the ending theme "after song." Funimation acquired the series and streamed it on their website in North America and the British Isles, and on AnimeLab in Australia and New Zealand. The series ran for 12 episodes.

On September 12, 2021, Funimation announced the series would receive an English dub, which premiered the following day.

Notes

References

External links
 

1998 Japanese novels
2000 Japanese television series debuts
2000 Japanese television series endings
2001 manga
2003 manga
2008 manga
2020 anime television series debuts
Akita Shoten manga
Anime and manga based on novels
Anime postponed due to the COVID-19 pandemic
Digital Manga Publishing titles
Doga Kobo
Funimation
Japanese novels
Japanese serial novels
Kodansha manga
Seinen manga
Tokyo MX original programming